The 2017–18 Leicester City season was the club's 113th season in the English football league system and its 50th (non-consecutive) season in the top tier of English football. This season saw Leicester City participate in the Premier League for the fourth consecutive season as well as the FA Cup and EFL Cup.

The season covered the period from 1 July 2017 to 30 June 2018.

Transfers

Transfers in

Transfers out

Loans in

Loans out

Players and staff

First team squad

Pre-season

Premier League Asia Trophy

Pre-season friendlies 
Leicester City announced five pre-season friendlies against Burton Albion, Luton Town, Wolverhampton Wanderers, Milton Keynes Dons and Borussia Mönchengladbach.

Competitions

Overview

Premier League

League table

Result summary

Results by matchday

Matches
On 14 June 2017, the 2017–18 season fixtures were announced. Leicester City played in the first Premier League fixture that opened the season on Friday.

FA Cup
In the FA Cup, Leicester City entered the competition in the third round and were drawn away to Fleetwood Town.

EFL Cup 
Leicester City entered in the second round of the competition with an away trip to Sheffield United. A home tie against Liverpool was confirmed for the third round. Another home tie was drawn for the fourth round with Leeds United the visitors. A third consecutive home tie in the competition was announced for the quarter-finals, against Manchester City.

Squad statistics

Appearances

|-
!colspan="14"|Players who left during the season

|}

Top scorers

Awards

Club awards
Leicester's annual award ceremony, including categories voted for by the players and supporters, was held on 1 May 2018. The following awards were made:

References 

Leicester City
Leicester City F.C. seasons